MS Abkhazia was one of six Soviet s during the late 1920s built for the Black Sea State Shipping Company. During the Second World War, she participated in the Siege of Odessa in 1941 and the Siege of Sevastopol in 1942. She was sunk by German aircraft in the port in June.

Description 
The four ships built in Leningrad were shorter than the pair built in Germany, but had more powerful engines. She had a pair of six-cylinder, two-stroke diesel engines, each driving a screw propeller, and the engines were rated at a total of 1,372 nominal horsepower. The ship had a designed capacity of 450 passengers.

Construction and career 
Abkhazia was one of the four ships in the class that were constructed in 1928 at the Baltic Works shipyard in Leningrad. After completion the ship was assigned to the Black Sea State Shipping Company by Sovtorgflot with its port of registry at Odessa.

After the invasion of the Soviet Union on 22 June 1941 (Operation Barbarossa) by Nazi Germany and its allies, Abkhazia was used for military tasks. On 16–21 September, she served as a troopship ferrying part of the 157th Rifle Division from Novorossiysk to Odessa. A day after commencing the voyage, the convoy of which she was a part was fruitlessly attacked by German aircraft. The division was evacuated from Odessa to Sevastopol in several convoys between 3 and 6 October with the ship ferrying her portion of the division on 5 October. Abkhazia arrived in Odessa on 14 October to begin loading the city's defenders and reached Sevastopol on the 16th without damage despite repeated German air attacks.

The liner transported elements of the 386th Rifle Division from Novorossiyk to Sevastopol on 1–5 January 1942 and made another trip at the beginning of March. Abkhazia arrived in the besieged port with supplies on 2 April, followed by another trip on 10 April. Together with the destroyer , the ship delivered 1,958 men, 209 tons of fuel and 348 tons of supplies on 21 May. At the beginning of June, Abkhazia was part of a convoy that brought 2,785 troops to reinforce the garrison and evacuated 487 wounded men and 722 civilians on the return voyage. On the night of 9/10 June, Abkhazia was part of a convoy bound for Sevastopol that was unsuccessfully attacked by Heinkel He 111 torpedo bombers from the Second Group of Bomber Wing 26. The following morning the ship was set on fire by bombs delivered by the First Group of Bomber Wing 100. An attack 10 minutes later by Junkers Ju 87 dive bombers caused the liner to roll over against the adjacent pier. She remained on fire until her cargo of ammunition finally exploded around 22:00.

References

Bibliography

 

Krim-class ocean liner
Ships built at the Baltic Shipyard
Ships sunk by German aircraft
World War II passenger ships of the Soviet Union
Maritime incidents in June 1942
World War II shipwrecks in the Black Sea